Carlos de los Santos Jara Saguier (born 25 August 1950 in Asunción) is a former Paraguayan football player who works as a coach.

Carlos is one of the seven Jara Saguier brothers that played professional football in Paraguay.

Career
Born in Asunción, Jara Saguier played as a midfielder and spent the best years of his career at Cerro Porteño of Paraguay and Cruz Azul of Mexico. He played for the Paraguay national football team from 1970 to 1981.

As a coach, Jara Saguier led the Paraguay national football team to a historic silver medal in the 2004 Olympic Games, and in 2005 he led Querétaro F.C. of Mexico to his first Primera A championship.

Jara Saguier also coached clubs like Libertad, Nacional, Olimpia and Sportivo Luqueño of Paraguay and Monterrey FC and Cruz Azul Hidalgo of México.

References

External links
 
 
 CV at RPetters.com
 Carlos Jara Saguier at Footballdatabase

1950 births
Living people
Paraguayan footballers
Paraguay international footballers
Liga MX players
Cruz Azul footballers
Cerro Porteño players
Club Libertad footballers
General Caballero Sport Club footballers
Paraguayan football managers
Paraguay national football team managers
2004 Copa América managers
Club Olimpia managers
C.F. Monterrey managers
Querétaro F.C. managers
Paraguayan expatriate footballers
Expatriate footballers in Mexico
Association football midfielders
Club Nacional managers
Sportivo Trinidense managers
Club Sol de América managers
Sportivo Luqueño managers
Deportivo Santaní managers
Independiente F.B.C. managers